The Syndicalist Party was a left-wing political party in Spain, formed by Ángel Pestaña in 1932. Pestaña, a leading member of the Confederación Nacional del Trabajo (CNT) trade union, formed the party in response to the growing influence of the Iberian Anarchist Federation over the CNT.

The thesis of Ángel Pestaña was to contribute to the workers' movement by endowing it with a political party which, without interfering in their work, collaborated with the industrial unions, but with full autonomy. It differed from the PSOE-UGT pact in that it intended to avoid all subordination of union work to partisan political interests. Pestaña's libertarian possibilist tendency corresponded with the British Independent Labour Party, a representation of workers' interests in Parliament with a revolutionary purpose; that is, the achievement of libertarian communism with an organization based on the cooperatives, trade unions and municipalities.

History 

Only a minority in the CNT, the possibilist tendency was isolated due to its moderate syndicalist stance, and depended on several cells in Madrid, Andalusia, Zaragoza, Catalonia, and Valencia. The Syndicalist Party published a daily newspaper, . In Barcelona the Catalan Federation of the party published  (1936–1937) and then  until January 1939. The youth wing of the party was the Syndicalist Youth. The republican artillery captain Eduardo Medrano Rivas was party secretary. In the 1936 Spanish general election two party members, Pestaña and Benito Pabón, were elected to the parliament as affiliates of the Popular Front.

The group backed the Republican faction during the Spanish Civil War. However, affected by the death of Ángel Pestaña, the party dissolved itself in December 1937, still numbering 30,000 members.

Refoundation (1974-1985) 
In 1974 a new generation of syndicalists launched a party with the same name, based on the tradition of the old Syndicalist Party. In the 1977 Spanish general election, together with the still illegal Communist Movement, Socialist Movement and Workers' Communist Party, it formed part of an electoral alliance called the Popular Unity Candidacy (CUP), positioned to the left of the Communist Party of Spain. In the 1979 Spanish general election the Syndicalist Party obtained 9,777 votes (0.05%), the majority of them obtained in Catalonia where it got 5,932 votes (0.2%). The party lasted until 1985, when it once again dissolved itself.

References 

1932 establishments in Spain
1937 disestablishments in Spain
1974 establishments in Spain
1985 disestablishments in Spain
Anarchist political parties
Defunct socialist parties in Spain
Formerly banned political parties in Spain
Formerly banned socialist parties
Libertarian socialist parties
Political parties disestablished in 1937
Political parties disestablished in 1985
Political parties established in 1932
Political parties established in 1974
Political parties of the Spanish Civil War
Syndicalism
Syndicalist political parties